The Bemaraha woolly lemur (Avahi cleesei), also known as Cleese's woolly lemur, is a species of woolly lemur native to western Madagascar, named after John Cleese. The first scientist to discover the species named it after Cleese, star of Monty Python, mainly because of Cleese's fondness for lemurs, as shown in Operation Lemur With John Cleese and Fierce Creatures, and his efforts at protecting and preserving them. The species was first recorded in 1990 by a team of scientists from Zurich University led by Urs Thalmann, but wasn't formally described as a species until November 11, 2005.

It typically has a strictly vegetarian diet of leaves and buds, living together in small families. The local population calls the species dadintsifaky, which means "Grandfather of the sifaka", because it is similarly sized to sifakas, but more ponderous, heavyset and has ample greyish-brown fur.

The habitat is limited to the Tsingy de Bemaraha Strict Nature Reserve in western Madagascar, which is a UNESCO World Heritage Site. The animal is probably threatened with becoming extinct in the long run, since the size of the population is unknown so far and its habitat shrinks continuously.

Description
It is found in Western Madagascar, near the village of Ambalarano. Its face is slightly more pale than its upper head, and the area above the nose extends to the forehead to contrast with the triangular pattern created by the forehead fur. The fur that borders the face is a black tone and forms a dark pattern in the shape of a line or stripe that resembles the letter "V". Its eyes are a maroon color with black eyelids, and the snout is black and hairless, while the corners of the mouth have a white tone. The fur on the head and body is a brown-gray color and has a slightly curled/freckled appearance. Its tail is beige or brownish-gray in color, and slightly red on the dorsal side of the base. The surface color of the lower limbs of the species is white, while the chest, belly, and inner area of the upper limbs is a light gray color with relatively thin fur.

References

External links

BBC News report on the finding
New Scientist article
Endangered lemurs get Fawlty name 
 Report with photo

Mammals described in 2005
Woolly lemurs

fr:Avahi de Cleese